Social Psychology Quarterly is a peer-reviewed academic journal that publishes theoretical and empirical papers in the field of social psychology. The editors-in-chief are Jody Clay-Warner, Dawn Robinson, and Justine Tinkler (University of Georgia). It is published by SAGE Publications on behalf of the American Sociological Association, of which this is an official journal.

History 
The journal was established in 1937 under the title Sociometry by Jacob L. Moreno, who served as publisher and chair of the editorial committee until 1955. In 1955,  Moreno transferred ownership of the journal to the American Sociological Society (now the American Sociological Association), which has published the journal continuously since then. The journal's name was changed to Social Psychology in 1978 and it obtained its current name in 1979.

Abstracting and indexing 
Social Psychology Quarterly is abstracted and indexed in Scopus and the Social Sciences Citation Index. According to the Journal Citation Reports, its 2017 impact factor is 2.341, ranking it 18th out of 64 journals in the category "Psychology, Social".

Past Editors
The following persons have been editors-in-chief of the journal:

See also
 ASA style

References

External links 
 
 Journal page at American Sociological Association homepage

Publications established in 1937
Sociology journals
SAGE Publishing academic journals
Quarterly journals
Social psychology journals
English-language journals
American Sociological Association academic journals